XEHG-AM is a radio station on 1370 AM in Mexicali, Baja California, Mexico. It is owned by Grupo Audiorama Comunicaciones and carries a Spanish Contemporary format known as Vida.

Previous logo

History
XEHG received its first concession on October 23, 1958. It was owned by Luis Blando López.

References

1958 establishments in Mexico
Radio stations established in 1958
Radio stations in Mexicali
Spanish-language radio stations